The decade of the 1790s in archaeology involved some significant events.

Explorations
 1799: Napoleon in Egypt: French troops occupy Egyptian territory. Tomb KV20 in the Valley of the Kings is located.

Excavations
 1796: The Roman fort, vicus, bridge abutments and associated remains of Hadrian's Wall are excavated at Chesters, in England.
 1798: The first recorded excavations at Stonehenge are made by William Cunnington and Richard Colt Hoare.
 Formal excavations continue at Pompeii.

Finds
 1790
 Pediment of the Roman temple at Bath, England, is discovered during work near the Roman Baths.
 Townley Discobolus and Lansdowne Heracles are discovered at Hadrian's Villa in Tivoli, Italy.
 Bones presumed to be those of English poet John Milton (d. 1674) are disinterred during repairs to the church of St Giles-without-Cripplegate in London.
 December 17 - The late post-classic Mexica Aztec sun stone is discovered during repairs to Mexico City Metropolitan Cathedral.
 1796: Summer - Ribchester Hoard and helmet found in Lancashire, England.
 1797: July 17 - The tomb of John, King of England (d. 1216), is rediscovered at Worcester Cathedral in front of the altar.
 1799: July 15 - At the town of Rosetta (Rashid), a harbor on the Mediterranean coast of Egypt, French troops find the Rosetta Stone, inscribed with parallel texts in Greek, Egyptian demotic and hieroglyphs (translated in 1822 by Jean-François Champollion).

Publications
 1793: James Douglas - Nenia Britannica, or, A Sepulchral History of Great Britain, from the earliest period to its general conversion to Christianity (published complete), the first account of the excavation of an Anglo-Saxon site (in Kent) with artefacts systematically described and illustrated.
 1797: James Hutton, a Scotsman who has been called "the Father of Geology," publishes theories describing the earth as destroying and renewing itself in a never-ending cycle.
 1799: Vice President of the United States Thomas Jefferson, writing in Transactions of the American Philosophical Society 4, describes the bones of Megalonyx jeffersonii, an extinct ground sloth.

Other events
 1797: January 3 - Three of the stones making up Stonehenge fall due to heavy frosts.
 1798: December 10 - Some antiquities being shipped to England by Sir William Hamilton are lost in the wreck of HMS Colossus.

Births
 1790: December 22 - Jean-François Champollion, French decipherer of Egyptian hieroglyphs (d. 1832)
 1793: January 22 - Caspar Reuvens, founder of Rijksmuseum van Oudheden (Netherlands National Museum of Antiquities), first professor of archaeology (d. 1835)
 1794: July 7 - Frances Stackhouse Acton, née Knight, English botanist, archaeologist, artist and writer (d. 1881)
 1796: November 27 - John MacEnery, Irish-born priest and pioneer archaeologist (d. 1841)
 1797: October 5 - John Gardiner Wilkinson, English traveller, writer and pioneer Egyptologist (d. 1875)
 1799: December 12 (23) - Karl Bryullov, Russian painter of The Last Day of Pompeii (d. 1852)

Deaths
 1795: April 30 - Jean-Jacques Barthélemy French writer and numismatist (b. 1716)

References

Archaeology by decade
Archaeology